The Great Radium Mystery is a 1919 American silent adventure film serial directed by Robert Broadwell and Robert F. Hill. This serial is now considered a lost film.

Cast
 Cleo Madison as Countess Nada
 Bob Reeves as Jack Turner (credited as Robert Reeves)
 Eileen Sedgwick as Gloria Marston
 Bob Kortman as The Buzzard
 Ed Brady as Frank Bird
 Jefferson Osborne as John Marston (credited as Jeff Osborne)
 Robert Gray as The Hawk
 Gordon McGregor as The Rat
 Fred Hamer

Chapter titles
 The Mystic Stone
 The Death Trap
 The Fatal Ride
 The Swing for Life
 The Torture Chamber
 The Tunnel of Doom
 A Flash in the Dark
 In the Clutches of a Mad Man
 The Roaring Volcano
 Creeping Flames
 Perils of Doom
 Shackled
 The Scalding Pit
 Hemmed In
 The Flaming Arrow
 Over the Cataract
 The Wheels of Death
 Liquid Flames

See also
 List of film serials
 List of film serials by studio
 List of lost films

References

External links

1919 films
1919 adventure films
American adventure films
American silent serial films
American black-and-white films
Films directed by Robert F. Hill
Lost American films
Universal Pictures film serials
1919 lost films
Lost adventure films
1910s American films
Silent adventure films